The canton of Boutières is an administrative division of the Haute-Loire department, south-central France. It was created at the French canton reorganisation which came into effect in March 2015. Its seat is in Tence.

It consists of the following communes:
 
Chenereilles
Dunières
Le Mas-de-Tence
Montfaucon-en-Velay
Montregard
Raucoules
Riotord
Saint-Bonnet-le-Froid
Saint-Jeures
Saint-Julien-Molhesabate
Saint-Romain-Lachalm
Tence

References

Cantons of Haute-Loire